Solitaria may refer to:
 Solitaria, an order of Entoprocta in the phylum Kamptozoa
 Solitaria (lichen), a genus of fungi in the family Teloschistaceae
 Solitaria, a genus of plants in the family Caryophyllaceae, synonym of Shivparvatia